G 2/93 is a decision issued on 21 December 1994 by the Enlarged Board of Appeal of the European Patent Office (EPO). The decision deals with deposits of biological material. More specifically, the decision deals with the time limit for the deposit of such material. The current provision in  provides for a time limit of sixteen months from the date of filing or from the date of priority, whichever expires earlier.

Question referred to the Enlarged Board of Appeal
The referral to the Enlarged Board of Appeal lies from an interlocutory decision T 815/90 from Technical Board of Appeal 3.3.2. The referred question is:

Answer to the referred question
The Enlarged Board of Appeal answered this question as follows:

References

Further reading 
 : "Sufficiency of disclosure - date of compliance"
 : "The requirement of sufficiency in the biotechnology field - deposit of living material"
 : "Procedural questions - late submission of deposit number"
 : "Interpretation of the EPC - implementing regulations"

External links 
 G 0002/93 of 21 December 1994
 Decision G 2/93, Official Journal EPO 275/1995
Decision T 445/08 of 30 January 2012 (referring decision)

G 2012 1
1994 in case law
1994 in Europe
Jurisdiction